Gigantopygus is an extinct genus of redlichiid trilobites. It lived during the early part of the Botomian stage, a faunal stage during the Early Cambrian, which lasted from approximately 524 to 518.5 million years ago. Fossils are found in Morocco and Spain

References

Redlichioidea
Redlichiida genera
Cambrian first appearances
Cambrian extinctions
Fossils of Spain
Fossils of Morocco